Ishberda (İşbirźe) is a rural locality (a selo) and the administrative centre of Ishberdinsky Selsoviet, Baymaksky District, Bashkortostan, Russia. The population was 638 as of 2010. There are 6 streets.

Geography 
Ishberda is located 73 km southwest of Baymak (the district's administrative centre) by road. Krepostnoy Zilair is the nearest rural locality.

References 

Rural localities in Baymaksky District